Centrolobium yavizanum, the amarillo guayaquil or amarillo puyú, is a species of flowering plant in the family Fabaceae. It is found in Colombia and Panama. It is threatened by habitat loss.

References

Dalbergieae
Vulnerable plants
Taxonomy articles created by Polbot